Adelaide Dorn Wallerstein McConnell (March 4, 1869 –  June 12, 1942) was an American translator, medical doctor, lawyer, and clubwoman, based in New York City.

Early life 
Adelaide Dorn was from Worcester, Massachusetts. She graduated from law school at New York University in 1898, and earned her medical degree at the New York Medical College and Hospital for Women in 1905.

Career 
Wallerstein practiced medicine from an office in her New York home, and in 1905 founded a free clinic, the East Side Clinic for Children. She was president of the clinic for 25 years, until it closed in 1931. She also translated French literature into English.

"There is no better-known clubwoman in New York than Mrs. Harry Wallerstein," noted the cover of Broadway Weekly in 1904.  She was  president of the Woman's Legal Aid Society when it began in 1898, and president of the Adelaide Wallerstein Auxiliary of the National Army Relief Association for Porto Rico; the latter organization sent books, blankets, and disinfectants to American soldiers during the Spanish–American War. During World War I she organized a women's group to assist the Marines. She was also active in the Daughters of the American Revolution and the Women's Press Club of New York. She headed the Philocalian Society in 1907, a group of clubwomen who sought to discourage young women from drinking, low-cut gowns, and late-night socializing in New York.

Adelaide Wallerstein was president of the Rubenstein Club, from 1904 until a controversial ouster in 1909. In response, she founded the New York Mozart Society; the society's chorus performed at the White House in 1911, with Arthur Claassen conducting. She was president of the Mozart Society from 1909 to 1937.

Personal life 
Adelaide married businessman Henry "Harry" Wallerstein in 1899; they divorced in 1910. In 1911 she married businessman Noble McConnell. She died at the Hotel Astor in New York City in 1942, aged 73 years. Congressman Chris Shays is her grand-nephew; he is the grandson of Adelaide McConnell's sister, Lillian Cecile Dorn Shays.

References

External links 

 

American lawyers
American physicians
1869 births
1942 deaths
American translators
American women in World War I
New York University alumni
New York Medical College alumni
20th-century American people